My Very Special Guests is a duet album by American country music artist George Jones released in 1979 on the Epic Records label.

Background
By the late 1970s, Jones was in such bad shape from his drinking and cocaine addiction that it took him the better part of two years to complete My Very Special Guests, a 1979 duet album that featured the wayward singer performing songs with a wide range of admirers and peers, including Emmylou Harris, Waylon Jennings, Linda Ronstadt, and Elvis Costello.  In the 1989 Jones documentary, Same Ole Me, producer Billy Sherrill admits, "Well, we put an incredible amount of hours in the studio. Some of those songs, one verse would be a year away from the chorus because he'd come in and his voice wouldn't be up to it."  Since his divorce from Tammy Wynette in 1975, Jones' life had truly started to spiral out of control. In December 1976, he was sued for drunkenly assaulting two women in Nashville and, in February 1977, a federal tax lien was filed against his Alabama residence.  Wynette was also after him for unpaid alimony and Jones, who began missing shows at an astonishing rate, filed for bankruptcy.  In his 1996 autobiography, Jones admitted that when his lawyer filed the bankruptcy petition, it listed forty-six creditors. "I owed $1.5 million," he wrote. "My net worth was $64,500." Jones had also been infuriated when his former drinking buddy, songwriter Earl Montgomery, had found religion and began to scold Jones for his behavior, leading the singer to fire a gun at, and very nearly hit, one of his best friends. In the 1994 article, "The Devil in George Jones", Nick Tosches recounts, "On the night after he turned 47, Jones fired a shot at Peanut Montgomery, who had recently quit drinking and found religion. 'All right, you son of a bitch,' he had hollered before pulling the trigger, 'see if your God can save you now!'" The publication of Wynette's autobiography Stand By Your Man in 1979, which painted an ugly picture of Jones, did not help matters. It was in the midst of all this chaos that Jones began recording the duets (almost all of them overdubbed) for My Very Special Guests.

Recording and composition
Jones fondness for the duet stretched back to the beginning of his career when, in 1957, he recorded "Yearning", a hit with Jeanette Hicks.  He also recorded with Margie Singleton, Melba Montgomery, Brenda Carter and, most famously, Wynette.  The idea for My Very Special Guests was to pair Jones with his own country peers but also team him with admirers from other genres, an idea that was quite ahead of its time in the 1970s (Frank Sinatra would pretty much do the same thing with his Duets series years later).  The album featured many of the country stars that Jones fans were familiar with, like Waylon Jennings, Willie Nelson, and Johnny Paycheck (all three riding high on the red hot "outlaw movement") and Wynette, who sings "It Sure Was Good" with her ex, a song that nostalgically recalled the good times of a broken relationship (Ironically, the song was co-authored by George Richey, who Wynette married in the summer of 1978).  The ambitious pairings with pop and rock singers may have displeased many hardcore Jones fans but one of the songs, James Taylor's "Bartender's Blues", had been a top ten country hit in 1978.  Taylor wrote the tune with Jones in mind and sang harmony on the track.  Pop star Linda Ronstadt also joins Jones on the wistful "I've Turned You To Stone" and the pair would perform an impromptu version when she showed up at his 1980 performance at New York City's Bottom Line nightclub.  Emmylou Harris, who began her singing career backing country rock pioneer and Jones fan Gram Parsons, duets with Jones on the Rodney Crowell original "Here We Are" (Harris, who would go on to record with Jones several more times, had written the original liner notes for the singer's 1976 album The Battle, proclaiming that "when you hear George Jones sing, you are hearing a man who takes a song and makes it a work of art - always").  The Staples Singers and Dennis Locorriere and Ray Sawyer of the rock band Dr. Hook are also featured, but the most curious vocal pairing on My Very Special Guests came with then current New Wave star Elvis Costello.  Costello, an avowed Jones fan, had originally recorded the song for his debut album but it was left off due to the suggestion that including it might confuse the general public. "When I was on the road back then, I used to have to hide my George Jones albums," Costello is quoted in the 2005 reissue of the album.  "My manager used to say, 'Turn that George Jones off'...Jones was my guiding light whenever I wrote in a country idiom."

My Very Special Guests is also a companion piece of sorts to an hour-and-a-quarter long HBO television special entitled George Jones: With a Little Help from His Friends, which saw the painfully wan singer performing songs with many of the singers from the album, including Jennings, who later recalled, "The best thing we ever cut together was a record of "Night Life" that we did for one of his albums for Billy Sherrill.  I'm singing so high you wouldn't believe it's me." In 2005, the album, which was reissued as a double CD with bonus tracks of duets taken from other Jones albums, sparked controversy because of its use of copy protection from Sony BMG's XCP technology.

Reception
My Very Special Guests produced no hit singles and only made it to number 38 on the Billboard country albums chart.  Jones biographer Bob Allen wrote in 1983 that the collection was "at best, a lackluster, spliced-together musical effort featuring George at his bronchitis and emphysema-ridden worst."  Jones also disparaged the record not long after it was released, revealing to Los Angeles Times music columnist Robert Hillburn, "I won't even listen to it.  It's eerie looking back on those days.  I was at a point in my life where I didn't care anymore.  It was real scary...Imagine yourself going to bed at night and staying in the darkness for five years." In a 1980 cover story for Country Music magazine in which he was interviewed by Wynette, Jones admitted of the album, "I did a bad performance of a lot of things on there, but some of them came out good, and some of them came out bad.  I wasn't in very good voice at all."

Track listing

2005 reissue
Disc 1
 "Night Life" (with Waylon Jennings)
 "Bartender's Blues" (with James Taylor)
 "Here We Are" (with Emmylou Harris)
 "I've Turned You to Stone" (with Linda Ronstadt)
 "It Sure Was Good" (with Tammy Wynette)
 "I Gotta Get Drunk" (with Willie Nelson)  
 "Proud Mary" (with Johnny Paycheck)
 "Stranger in the House" (with Elvis Costello)
 "I Still Hold Her Body (But I Think I've Lost Her Mind)" (with Dennis Locorriere and Ray Sawyer of Dr. Hook)
 "Will the Circle Be Unbroken" (with Pop Staples and Mavis Staples)
 "A Few Ole Country Boys" (with Randy Travis)
 "It Hurts as Much in Texas (As It Did in Tennessee)" (with Ricky Van Shelton)
 "You Never Looked That Good When You Were Mine" (with Patti Page)
 "All I Want to Do in Life" (with Janie Fricke)
 "Wonderful World Outside" (with Ralph Stanley)
 "You Can't Do Wrong and Get By" (with Ricky Skaggs)
 "You Don't Seem to Miss Me" (with Patty Loveless)
 "Patches" (with B.B. King)
 [Untitled Track] [CD-ROM Track]
 [Untitled Track] [CD-ROM Track]

Disc 2
 "A Good Year for the Roses" (with Alan Jackson)
 "Yesterday's Wine" (with Merle Haggard)
 "Our Love Was Ahead of Its Time" (with Deborah Allen)
 "We Sure Make Good Love" (with Loretta Lynn)
 "Size Seven Round (Made of Gold)" (with Lacy J. Dalton)
 "I Got Stripes" (with Johnny Cash)
 "Fiddle and Guitar Band" (with Charlie Daniels)
 "We Didn't See a Thing" (with Ray Charles and Chet Atkins)
 "The Love Bug" (with Vince Gill)
 "Love's Gonna Live Here" (with Buck Owens)
 "If I Could Bottle This Up" (with Shelby Lynne)
 "If You Can Touch Her at All" (with Lynn Anderson)
 "All That We've Got Left" (with Vern Gosdin)
 "This Bottle (In My Hand)" (with David Allan Coe)
 "Talking to Hank" (with Mark Chesnutt)
 "Never Bit a Bullet Like This" (with Sammy Kershaw)
 "The Race Is On" (with Travis Tritt)
 "I've Been There" (with Tim Mensy)
 "Traveller's Prayer" (with Sweethearts of the Rodeo)
 [Untitled Track] [CD-ROM Track]
 [Untitled Track] [CD-ROM Track]

References

External links
 George Jones' Official Website
 Record Label

1979 albums
George Jones albums
Albums produced by Billy Sherrill
Epic Records albums